"Médicament" is a song by French rapper Niska featuring Booba released in 2019. It charted atop the French SNEP singles chart, and was one of two chart-topping songs Niska had in 2019, with the other being "Méchant".

Charts

Weekly charts

Year-end charts

Certifications

References

2019 singles
2019 songs
Niska (rapper) songs
SNEP Top Singles number-one singles
French-language songs